The Fish Are Safe is a 1986 Australian TV movie directed by Noni Hazlehurst.

Plot
The romantic adventures of Lena Ranner a 34-year-old freelance graphic artist and a somewhat cranky, 60-year-old builder called Ned Foley.

Cast
Michele Fawdon as Lena Ranner
Peter Cummings as Ned Foley

Production
It was filmed March–May 1986. Hazlehurst said it was a "lovely script" and being asked to direct was "a great honour".

References

External links
The Fish Are Safe at IMDb

Australian television films
1986 television films
1986 films
1980s English-language films